The American Educational Research Journal  is a peer-reviewed academic journal that covers the field of educational research. The editors are Ellen Goldring (Vanderbilt University), Angela Calabrese-Barton (University of Michigan), Mike Cunningham (Tulane University), Sean Kelly (University of Pittsburgh), Madeline Mavrogordato (Michigan State University), and Peter Youngs (University of Virginia). The managing editor is Kristin S. Anderson (Vanderbilt University).  It was established in 1964 and is currently published by SAGE Publications on behalf of the American Educational Research Association.

Abstracting and indexing 
The journal is abstracted and indexed in Scopus and the Social Sciences Citation Index. According to the Journal Citation Reports, its 2021 impact factor is 4.503.

References

External links 
 

SAGE Publishing academic journals
English-language journals
Bimonthly journals
Education journals
Publications established in 1960